Turn It Around: The Story of East Bay Punk is a 2017 documentary about the punk rock music scene of San Francisco and the surrounding San Francisco Bay Area from the late 1970s to the 1990s. It features interviews performances by dozens of associated artists, notably Green Day. Iggy Pop provides voice-over narration throughout the film.

Synopsis
The story begins with a look at the growth of punk rock in the San Francisco area through the 1970s and '80s, ultimately settling on the scene's locus of activities, 924 Gilman Street. Much of the documentary consists of vintage performance footage by various artists of the era, while interview segments include Kathleen Hanna, Tim Armstrong, Larry Livermore, Penelope Houston, Tre Cool, Ian Mackaye, Jello Biafra, and Miranda July, among others.

Production
Executive producers of the film were Pat Mangarella and the band Green Day. Corbett Redford produced the film for Jingletown and Capodezero production companies, with worldwide distribution handled by New York firm Abramorama. Redford directed the film and shared writing credit with Co-director Anthony Marchitiello. Camera work and film editing was done by Greg Schneider. The total running time is two hours and 38 minutes.

Home media and music release
The film was released on Blu-Ray and DVD on June 22, 2018. Simultaneously, a vinyl double-LP was issued by 1-2-3-4 Go! Records featuring 35 rare recordings from many of the bands seen in the film, including Green Day, Rancid, Crimpshrine, Isocracy, Jawbreaker and Operation Ivy. A cassette version of the soundtrack was released on July 6, 2018, packaged with a remastered reissue of Aaron Cometbus' tape compilation Lest We Forget (originally released on his BBT Tapes label in 1991). The compilation features demos, rehearsals and live recordings of many pre-Gilman Street Berkeley bands, including the pre-Operation Ivy band Basic Radio and the pre-Crimpshrine band S.A.G.

Track listing

See also
 Turn It Around!

References

External links
 
 
 Turn It Around: The Story of East Bay Punk at Rotten Tomatoes

2017 films
Documentary films about punk music and musicians
2010s English-language films